Heinrich Triepel (12 February 1868, Leipzig – 23 November 1946 in Untergrainau) was a German jurist and legal philosopher.

Life 
From 1913, he was professor of law in Berlin. He took critical aim at legal positivism, which at the time was the dominant legal conception in the German-speaking world. He was member of Free Conservative Party.

Main works:
Das Interregnum. 1892.
 Die neuesten Fortschritte auf dem Gebiete des Kriegsrechts. 1894.
Völkerrecht und Landesrecht, 1899
 Unitarismus und Föderalismus im Deutschen Reiche. 1907.
Die Zukunft des Völkerrechts, 1916
 Die Reichsaufsicht. Berlin 1917.
 Die Freiheit der Meere und der künftige Friedensschluß. Bern 1917.
 Virtuelle Staatsangehörigkeit. Berlin 1921.
 Streitigkeiten zwischen Reich und Ländern. Berlin 1923.
 Völkerrecht. (around 1924).
 Les rapports entre le droit interne et le droit international. 1925.
 Der Föderalismus und die Revision der Weimarer Reichsverfassung. (around 1925).
 Staatsrecht und Politik. Berlin 1926.
 Die Staatsverfassung und die politischen Parteien. Berlin 1928.
 Wesen und Entwicklung der Staatsgerichtsbarkeit. Berlin 1929.
 Die Staatsverfassung und die politischen Parteien. 1930.
 Internationale Wasserläufe. 1931.
Die Hegemonie – Ein Buch von führenden Staaten, 1938

References

Presidents of the Humboldt University of Berlin
Academic staff of Leipzig University
Academic staff of the University of Kiel
Academic staff of the University of Tübingen
Members of the Institut de Droit International
Jurists from Saxony
Writers from Leipzig
1946 deaths
1868 births
International law scholars
19th-century jurists
20th-century jurists
19th-century German jurists
20th-century German jurists
Free Conservative Party politicians